In Norse mythology, Hlökk or Hlǫkk (Old Norse "noise, battle") is a valkyrie. Hlökk is attested as among the 13 valkyries listed in the Poetic Edda poem Grímnismál, and additionally in both Nafnaþulur lists found in the Prose Edda.

Notes

References

 Orchard, Andy (1997). Dictionary of Norse Myth and Legend. Cassell. 

Valkyries